The average age at which intestinal tumors are diagnosed ranges between 10–12 years for cats and 6 to 9 years for dogs. There are many different types of intestinal tumors, including lymphoma, adenocarcinoma, mast cell tumor, and leiomyosarcoma.

Signs and symptoms
The symptoms can vary but include weight loss, diarrhea, vomiting, and anorexia.

Diagnosis
The veterinarian will typically perform a series of tests such as blood tests and imaging studies. The most definitive way to confirm/rule out intestinal tumors is to perform a medical procedure called endoscopy to visualize the organ and do a tissue biopsy.

Treatment
Surgical treatment remains the treatment of choice for cats and dogs diagnosed with intestinal tumors who are in otherwise good health.

References

External links
 Intestinal Cancer in Cats and Dogs from Pet Cancer Center
Gastrointestinal Neoplasia from Merck Veterinary Manual'

Cancer in dogs
Cancer in cats
Types of animal cancers
Gastrointestinal cancer